Zag Bank was a Canadian direct bank owned by Desjardins Group. Zag was founded as Bank West in High River, Alberta in 2002 and acquired by Desjardins in 2011 along with the other Western Financial Group companies. Desjardins announced on November 5, 2018 the winding down of operations for Zag Bank effective 2019.

History
The Western Financial Group initially focused on insurance consolidation, but expanded into banking in 2002, when Bank West was established. The bank maintained offices in High River and Winnipeg.  

The bank acquired Ubiquity Bank in November 2007 and Agrifinancial in February 2009.
In 2010, Western Financial was acquired by the Desjardins Group and the transaction was completed in 2011.
In 2014, the Desjardins Group changed the name of Bank West to Zag Bank.

On 5 November 2018, Zag Bank announced the end of all remaining operations by the second quarter of 2019.

See also 
 List of Canadian banks

References 

Defunct banks of Canada
Companies based in Calgary
Desjardins Group
2011 mergers and acquisitions
2019 disestablishments in Alberta
Online banks
2002 establishments in Alberta
Banks established in 2002
Banks disestablished in 2019